Pycnogonidae is a family of sea spiders.

Characteristics
Most sea spiders in the class Pycnogonida have appendages on the anterior end of the body called chelifores which are used for gathering food and palps which bear sensory organs. Members of the family Pycnogonidae have neither of these, instead using their proboscis to suck juices from their prey. On the first segment of the trunk of male family members there are ovigerous legs on which the larvae are carried. The females do not have these appendages. Like most sea spiders, species in this family have four pairs of legs, except for three species (Pentapycnon bouvieri, P. charcoti, and P. geayi) with five pairs.

Genera
The World Register of Marine Species lists the following genera:
Pentapycnon Bouvier, 1910
Pycnogonum Bruennich, 1764
Pycnopallene Stock, 1950

References

Pycnogonids
Chelicerate families